Pocahontas State Park is a state park located in Chesterfield, Virginia, United States, not far from the state capitol of Richmond. As of 2015, the yearly visitation was 1,142,601.

The park is named after Chief Powhatan's daughter Pocahontas.

Civilian Conservation Corps Museum
The park is the site of the Civilian Conservation Corps Museum with exhibits about the work of the Civilian Conservation Corps in Virginia. Located in a building constructed by the CCC, the museum's exhibits include photographs, artifacts and personal mementos.

Mountain biking
There are many miles of mountain biking singletrack available at Pocahontas for a variety of skill levels.  These narrow trails feature log hops, tight turns, water crossings, and rock gardens.  The park uses a ski style grading system to mark the singletrack, that is different from other trails in the park.  There are 3 distinct trail systems in the park, Morgan trail system, Lakeview trail system, and the newest system, Swift Creek trail system.  These trails are maintained in large part by a 501c3 volunteer organization, the Friends of Pocahontas aka FOPSP.  A number of races occur annually in the park.

In addition to the single track, there are miles and miles of multi-use fire roads around the park.  A number of fairly well-marked routes exist for visitors to follow.

Fishing
The park has a number of streams and lakes for fishing.  The park also has a few fishing events and permit-free days, except for catching small panfish, largemouth bass, and pike.

External links
Pocahontas State Park - official website
Civilian Conservation Corps Museum at Pocahontas State Park

References

State parks of Virginia
Parks in Chesterfield County, Virginia
Museums in Chesterfield County, Virginia
Civilian Conservation Corps museums
History museums in Virginia
Civilian Conservation Corps in Virginia
National Register of Historic Places in Chesterfield County, Virginia
Historic districts on the National Register of Historic Places in Virginia
Parks on the National Register of Historic Places in Virginia
Protected areas established in 1946
1946 establishments in Virginia